Tarini Choudhury Govt. Girls H.S. & M.P. School, also known as Tarini Charan Girls' Higher Secondary School, is a public school located in Guwahati, Assam, India. It is named after educationist Tarini Charan Choudhury.

It is organizing its Platinum Jubilee celebration this year.

History
The Tarini Charan Girls school was founded in the 1950s and was initially located in the Uzanbazar area of Guwahati. It subsequently shifted to the present site located at the Guwahati club. In December 1963 the Government decided to take over the school, which had previously been government-aided.

The previous principal of the school was Haramohan Dev Goswami. As of 2018, the school has had no principal or vice-principal in post for five years, and twenty-five staff vacancies in total, which has "crippled" the school and pupils' results and the number who are able to take science subjects.

Notable alumni
Nirupama Borgohain, journalist
Mamoni Raisom Goswami, activist and writer

References

Schools in Guwahati
Girls' schools in Assam
High schools and secondary schools in Assam
Educational institutions in India with year of establishment missing